NGC 4260 is a barred spiral galaxy in the constellation Virgo. It was discovered by William Herschel on April 13, 1784.

Gallery

References

External links
 

Barred spiral galaxies
Virgo (constellation)
4260
07361
Astronomical objects discovered in 1788
Discoveries by William Herschel
039656